Christmas Comes to Pac-Land is a 1982 animated Christmas television special and spin-off of the Saturday morning animated series Pac-Man based on the video game, produced by Hanna-Barbera. It premiered in prime time on ABC on December 16, 1982.

Plot
During Christmas Eve, Pac-Man, along with his family are having fun in the snow, but end up having to fight off and eat the Ghost Monsters. When they are defeated, the ghosts' eyes come across Santa Claus in his sleigh, scaring his reindeer and making him crash.

Pac-Man and his friends take Santa to his house for shelter, where he explains to them, who are unfamiliar with Christmas, what it is and that he needs to get back to delivering gifts. Pac-Man volunteers to search for Santa's lost toys along with his dog Chomp-Chomp, while his friends rebuild Santa's sleigh.

As they search for the gifts, Pac-Man and Chomp-Chomp find out that the Ghost Monsters have found them. The ghosts then chase and injure Pac-Man, while Chomp-Chomp takes the sack of toys. The two make it back to Pac-Man's house and return the gifts, and the sleigh has been fixed. Santa says it is too late to save Christmas, but Pac-Man gets an idea that might work.

Pac-Man and the gang drive somewhere, but then get cornered by the Ghost Monsters. Pac-Man attempts to reason with them, telling them how cheerful and warm Christmas is, and they, touched by this, let them pass. The group arrive in the Power Pellet Forest,  and Santa's reindeer eat the Power Pellets, making them fly again. When Pac-Man and his friends and family arrive back in his house, they realize there is a Christmas tree and presents left inside, and celebrate Christmas along with the Ghost Monsters (who came inside attempting to attack them, only to change their minds when Pac-Man gives them presents).

Voices
Marty Ingels - Pac-Man
Barbara Minkus - Mrs. Pepper Pac-Man
Russi Taylor - Pac-Baby
Peter Cullen - Sour Puss / Santa Claus
Frank Welker - Chomp Chomp / Morris Reindeer
Neil Ross - Clyde
Barry Gordon - Inky
Chuck McCann - Blinky / Pinky / Officer O'Pac
Susan Silo - Sue

References

External links
 

1982 television specials
1980s American television specials
1980s animated television specials
Pac-Man
American Broadcasting Company television specials
Hanna-Barbera television specials
Santa Claus in television
Films directed by Ray Patterson (animator)
American Christmas television specials